Maculotriton is a genus of sea snails, marine gastropod mollusks in the family Muricidae, the murex snails or rock snails.

Species
Species within the genus Maculotriton include:

 Maculotriton bracteatus 
 Maculotriton digitalis (Reeve, 1844)
 Maculotriton serriale (Deshayes, 1834)

References